Art competitions were held as part of the 1920 Summer Olympics in Antwerp, Belgium.  Medals were awarded in five categories (architecture, literature, music, painting, and sculpture), for works inspired by sport-related themes.

Art competitions were part of the Olympic program from 1912 to 1948, but were discontinued due to concerns about amateurism and professionalism.  Since 1952, a non-competitive art and cultural festival has been associated with each Games.

Medal summary

Medal table
At the time, medals were awarded to these artists, but art competitions are no longer regarded as official Olympic events by the International Olympic Committee.  These events do not appear in the IOC medal database, and these totals are not included in the IOC's medal table for the 1920 Games.

Events summary

Architecture
The following architects took part:

Literature
The following writers took part:

Music
The following composers took part:

Painting
The following painters took part:

Sculpture
The following sculptors took part:

References

Sources

1920 Summer Olympics events
1920
1920 in art
Arts in Belgium